Apachyidae is a small family of earwigs, in the suborder Forficulina and the order Dermaptera. It is one of nine families in the suborder Forficulina, and contains two genera (placed in one subfamily, Apachyinae). It has been cited by Henrik Steinmann in his book, The Animal Kingdom, by Brindle in The Dermaptera of Africa, and by at least two others.

Genera
The family contains the following genera:

Apachyus
Dendroiketes

References

External links
 The Earwig Research Centre's Apachyidae database Instructions: type Apachyidae in the "family" field and click "search".

Forficulina
Dermaptera families